"Rollin' Nowhere" is a song written and recorded by American country music artist Michael Martin Murphey. It was released in May 1986 as the second single from the album Tonight We Ride. The song peaked at number 15 on the U.S. Billboard Hot Country Singles and at number 14 on the Canadian RPM Country Tracks chart.

Chart performance

References

1986 singles
Michael Martin Murphey songs
Songs written by Michael Martin Murphey
Song recordings produced by Jim Ed Norman
Warner Records singles